Littleworth is a hamlet in South Oxfordshire, about  east of Oxford, England. It is in Wheatley civil parish, immediately west of Wheatley village.

History

One was a post mill that burned down in 1875. The other, Wheatley Mill, is an octagonal tower mill that dates from before 1671. It has been rebuilt and re-equipped a number of times, including in 1763 after a fire and in 1784 when the Eagle Ironworks, Oxford supplied some of the machinery. The tower mill had fallen out of use by 1914, and lightning struck it in 1939.

Since 1976 the windmill has been under restoration. The mill is open to the public one Sunday a month from May until October.

British Railways closed the line and Wheatley station in 1963. Most of its route through Littleworth was in a cutting, with single-arched brick bridge that still carries Littleworth Road over it.

Amenities
Littleworth has one public house, the Cricketer's Arms free house.

Oxford Bus Company route 46 links Littleworth with Oxford via Horspath, Cowley and with Great Milton via Wheatley. Buses run hourly, seven days a week, from early morning until after midnight.

References

Hamlets in Oxfordshire
South Oxfordshire District